Athabasca Oil Corporation is a Canadian energy company with a focused strategy on the development of thermal and light oil assets. Situated in Alberta's Western Canadian Sedimentary Basin, the company has amassed a significant land base of extensive, high quality resources. Athabasca's common shares trade on the TSX under the symbol "ATH".

Operations 

AOC sold 60% of two assets, included above, to PetroChina in 2009.

AOC intends to produce oil through the steam-assisted gravity drainage (SAGD) method rather than through open-pit mining as older oil sands mines have. SAGD projects require less surface area than open-pit, but must consume additional energy for steam generation.

Ownership 
The company's highly anticipated initial public offering (IPO) in early 2010 was the largest Canadian IPO since that of Manulife Financial in 1999, and North America's largest in 2010 (as of March 31).

Following the IPO, AOC's share price dropped 33% in the first month of trading, making it Canada's worst-performing IPO since 2007.

In 2017, Athabasca purchased the entirety of Statoil's oil sands assets as the Norwegian giant exited the oil sands, including a producing plant, an undeveloped project, and some midstream assets. AOC sold the midstream assets to Enbridge in 2018.

Duvernay Formation

AOC's share price rose dramatically following the announcement of a $US1.2 billion Duvernay Formation acreage joint venture between Encana and PetroChina. Athabasca Oil Corporation holds the largest publicly disclosed Duvernay Formation acreage rights (640,000 acres).

Notes

References

External links 

Athabasca oil sands
Oil companies of Canada
Western Canadian Sedimentary Basin
Companies based in Calgary
Energy companies established in 2006
Non-renewable resource companies established in 2006
2006 establishments in Alberta
Companies listed on the Toronto Stock Exchange
Canadian companies established in 2006